Manolis Psomas (born 11 November 1978) is a football player who plays for Cretan club based in Rethymno, Episkopi
Psomas began his career with Panelefsiniakos F.C. and made 15 Alpha Ethniki appearances for the club.

Career

Panelefsiniakos

Psomas began his career with Panelefsiniakos and made 15 Alpha Ethniki appearances for the club.

Egaleo

In 2001, Psomas signed with Egaleo. He stayed in Egaleo for 6 years, making 138 league appearances and scoring 6 goals for the club. Psomas is loved like few by Egaleo fans, for his offer and success to the team from 2001 to 2007. He also appointed as captain.

Asteras Tripolis

Manolis joined Asteras Tripolis in 2007. He stayed there until 2009, making 33 league performances, without scoring any goals. His appearances with Asteras, were result to the people talk about him. Many Greek teams were interesting to sign Psomas, for his very good defending and aerial ability and the passion he was showing.

Kavala

In 2009–2010 season, Psomas played with Kavala's jersey, appearing in 16 league matches, scoring any goals. It was Kavala's second consecutive season in Greek Super League, and the team was playing very well, with Psomas help.

OFI

In 2010, Psomas joined OFI Crete, appearing in 16 league matches.

Levadiakos
In 2011, Psomas joined Levadiakos, as a free transfer and played 10 matches.

AEL
In January 2012, Psomas made a new step to his career signing with Greek Football League team AEL. He played till the end of the season 2012, appearing in 18 league matches.

External links
 Guardian Football
Profile at epae.org

1978 births
Living people
Greek footballers
Egaleo F.C. players
Kavala F.C. players
Asteras Tripolis F.C. players
OFI Crete F.C. players
Levadiakos F.C. players
Association football defenders
Panelefsiniakos F.C. players
Footballers from Rethymno